Sam Groth was the defending champion but retired in the second round against Jan Choinski.

Stefan Kozlov won the title after defeating Liam Broady 3–6, 7–5, 6–4 in the final.

Seeds

Draw

Finals

Top half

Bottom half

References

External links
Main draw
Qualifying draw

Las Vegas Challenger - Singles
Las Vegas Challenger